Salman Toor (born 1983) is a Pakistani-born American painter. His works depict the imagined lives of young men of South Asian-birth, displayed in close range in either South Asia and New York City fantasized settings. Toor lives and works in New York City.

Biography 
Salman Toor was born in 1983 in Lahore, Pakistan. He attended Aitchison College. Toor came to the United States to attend school at Ohio Wesleyan University, where he received a Bachelor of Arts degree in 2006. He then obtained his MFA degree from Pratt Institute in Brooklyn in 2009.

Toor is a part of a loosely-affiliated group of LGBTQ painters, sometimes called the New Queer Intimists, which also includes contemporaries Doron Langberg, Louis Fratino, Kyle Coniglio, Anthony Cudahy, TM Davy, and Devan Shimoyama.

In 2019, Toor was awarded a grant from the Joan Mitchell Foundation.

From 2020 to 2021, Toor's recent paintings were the subject of a solo exhibition, Salman Toor: How Will I Know at the Whitney Museum of American Art. From 2021 to 2022, Toor's painting, Museum Boys (2021) is on view at the Frick Collection; as part of the artist residency and the exhibition, Living Histories: Queer Views and Old Masters where it is placed in a room in conversation with two paintings by Johannes Vermeer, Officer and Laughing Girl (made between 1655 and 1660) and Mistress and Maid (c. 1667).. In 2022 in an exhibition similar to that at the Frick, Toor's works were placed in conversation with old master painting's from the museum's collection in the exhibition No Ordinary Love at the Baltimore Museum of Art in Baltimore, Maryland. In 2023, the exhibition will the voyage in a traveling modified version to the Rose Art Museum at Brandeis University and will be placed in concert with their European classic paintings as well. 

Toor's work is included in such museum collections as the Whitney Museum of American Art and Museum of Contemporary Art, Chicago.

Work 
Toor has described that his work is concerned with a variety of themes, such as treatment of brown men, young people in public and private spaces, and the role of technology in daily life. Curator Amika Trasi has noted ”They are ruminations on the identifications variously imposed on and adopted by queer South Asian men living in the diaspora”. In doing so, Trasi has written, Toor aims to include brown men in the art historical canon that is often missing this representation.

Growing up in Pakistan, Toor explained an interview that he drew inspiration from Pakistani advertisements. Once he began to focus more on art, Toor found inspiration in paintings from the Baroque, Neoclassical, and Rococo eras. Specifically Toor describes being inspired by Van Dyck, Peter Paul Reubens, Caravaggio, and Watteau. Curators note Toor’s art historical knowledge makes its way into his work. For example, critic and curator Joseph Wolin observes that Toor's The Bar on East 13th directly references Manet’s A Bar at the Folies-Bergere.

In terms of his figuration, Toor has explained, “I like these seemingly undernourished and hairy bodies of color inhabiting familiar, bourgeois, urban, interior spaces. I see these boys or men as well-educated, creative types discovering what it means to live an artist’s life in New York City and in the thick of changing ideas about race, immigration, and foreignness, and also what it means to be American. Sometimes they can look like lifestyle images. They are also fantasies about myself and my community."

Curators have noted Toor's paintings make use of bright, saturated colors to evoke emotion. Green is one of the most notable colors in his work. The artist cites the “nocturnal" quality that green can give to a painting, as well as it’s conflicting associations with poison and glamor. Toor works from memory and often depicts his friends in his paintings.  
Toor illustrated Amitav Ghosh's 2021 book in verse, Jungle Nama.

Art Market 
According to salesroom, Toor has performed well in the art market since 2020. While working in Pakistan, collectors Taimur Hassan and Kiran Nadar frequently purchased his work. After moving to New York, curators noted a change in style less reliant on master studies. Toor’s Whitney show sold almost entirely before opening to museum benefactors.

Toor's first appearance in the auctions was on the 20th of October at Phillips Auction House in London where Aashiana (Hearth and Home) sold for £138,600, double its estimate. On December 15, 2020, Liberty Porcelain (2012) went for £378,000 at Phillips Auction House in London. In June 2021 at the Phillips Auction House in Hong Kong, Girl with Driver (2013) sold for $890,000, which was five times the estimated price.

Exhibitions

2022 
 No Ordinary Love, Baltimore Museum of Art, Baltimore, Maryland

2020 
 How will I know, Whitney Museum of American Art, New York

2019 

 Them, Galerie Perrotin, New York 
 Home is Not a Place, Anat Ebgi Gallery, LA

2018 

 Are you Here? Lahore Biennale 2018, Lahore

2017 

 Deep Ssips, Honey Ramka, New York

2016 

 Kochi-Muziris Biennale 2016, Kochi 
 Go Figure, Aicon Gallery, New York

2015 
 Salman Toor: Drawings from ‘The Electrician’, Honey Ramka, New York

2014 

 Wretch, Honey Ramka, New York

2013 

 Cinephiliac: Art Transcending Technology and Motion, Twelve Gates Art Gallery, Philiadelphia
 Return of The Native, Rohtas II Gallery, Lahore

2012 

 Stop Play Pause Repeat, Lawrie Shabibi Gallery, Dubai Letters to Taseer II, Drawing Room Gallery, Lahore 2010
 All about Us, Canvas Gallery, Karachi

2009 

 Wounds, Aicon Gallery, London
 Exchange Show, Montclair University MFA Gallery, Montclair, New Jersey Pratt MFA Thesis Show, Stueben Gallery, Brooklyn

2008 

 Pratt in Lucca, Piazza del Anfiteatro, Lucca, Italy

References

Aitchison College alumni
Pakistani artists
Pakistani emigrants to the United States
21st-century American painters
Living people
Pratt Institute alumni
1983 births
Artists from Lahore
Pakistani LGBT artists
American LGBT artists
Ohio Wesleyan University alumni